The Graduate School of Education is a degree-granting graduate-level professional school on the New Brunswick campus of Rutgers, The State University of New Jersey.  Established in 1923, the school offers programs for Master of Education (Ed.M.), Doctor of Education (Ed.D.) and Doctor of Philosophy (Ph.D.) degrees. As of 2013, U.S. News & World Report ranks Rutgers graduate-level education programmes 47th in the country, and ninth in the Northeastern United States.

References

External links
 
 Rutgers, The State University of New Jersey

Rutgers University colleges and schools
Schools of education in New Jersey
Educational institutions established in 1923
1923 establishments in New Jersey